Maryevka is a rural locality (a village) in Malyshevskoye Rural Settlement, Selivanovsky District, Vladimir Oblast, Russia. The population was 25 as of 2010.

Geography 
Maryevka is located 38 km southwest of Krasnaya Gorbatka (the district's administrative centre) by road. Kochergino is the nearest rural locality.

References 

Rural localities in Selivanovsky District